Rataj Ordynacki  is a village in the administrative district of Gmina Godziszów, within Janów Lubelski County, Lublin Voivodeship, in eastern Poland.

The village has a population of 500.

References

Rataj Ordynacki